The Texas Open 2014 is the women's edition of the 2014 Texas Open, which is a tournament of the WSA World Tour event International (prize money: 50 000 $). The event took place in Houston in the United States from the 8th of April to the 13th April. Nour El Sherbini won her first Texas Open trophy, beating Dipika Pallikal in the final.

Prize money and ranking points
For 2014, the prize purse was $50,000. The prize money and points breakdown is as follows:

Seeds

Draw and results

See also
WSA World Tour 2014
Texas Open (squash)

References

External links
WSA Texas Open 2014 website
Texas 2014 official website

Squash tournaments in the United States
Texas Open
Texas Open
Texas Open
Squash in Texas